Abel Shongwe (born 26 June 1966) is a retired Swazi football midfielder.married to Chriselda Kurhula Shongwe

Kaizer Chiefs
He was invited for trials  by Ted Dumitru after his performance in a 3-2 win in a friendly against Orlando Pirates. He went AWOL so he could attend trials. He scored his first goal against Hellenic at Ellis Park Stadium. He requested a transfer to another team when he started fall behind to Mike Mangena, Nelson Dladla, Marks Maponyane and Shane McGregor.

Later career
A Swazi international, he joined Wits in 1988, Dynamos until they closed shop in 1991 and then Moroka Swallows in 1993 and left because of financial problems.

After retirement
He has coached a number of SAFA Second Division teams. He completed a course for his CAF B coaching license.

References

External links 

1966 births
Living people
People from Mbabane
Association football midfielders
Kaizer Chiefs F.C. players
Swazi footballers
Eswatini international footballers
Bidvest Wits F.C. players
AmaZulu F.C. players
Moroka Swallows F.C. players
Lamontville Golden Arrows F.C. players
Swazi expatriate footballers
Expatriate soccer players in South Africa
Swazi expatriate sportspeople in South Africa
Swazi football managers
Expatriate soccer managers in South Africa